TAGSAM or Touch-and-Go Sample Acquisition Mechanism is a robotic arm on the OSIRIS-REx space probe for collecting a sample from asteroid 101955 Bennu. OSIRIS-REx was launched in 2016, and arriving at the asteroid in December 2018 with plans to study the asteroid and return samples to Earth by 2023.

Overview
TAGSAM is a robotic arm attached to the main body of the spacecraft that collects a sample from the asteroid, and puts the samples into the Earth return vehicle. Bennu is about 500 meters in diameter and has very low gravity, so the arm must perform the collection in near zero gravity, yet still contend with some gravitational forces from the asteroid. One issue with small asteroids is their unique gravitational environment, and Bennu became the smallest body orbited by a spacecraft.

TAGSAM is designed to take up to three samples from the asteroid. The collection head is filled using a nitrogen gas injection that stirs up the regolith. SamCam will acquire images of the collection head. Two major parts of TAGSAM are the robotic arm and the sample collection head.

The arm is used in conjunction with several instruments on the spacecraft including three cameras, three spectrometers, and a laser altimeter.

Two identical TAGSAM units were made, one for use on the spacecraft called the flight unit and another for testing on Earth called the qualification unit.

Timeline

October 17, 2018 — TAGSAM head cover jettisoned
October 25, 2018 — Frangibolts fired, releasing the TAGSAM arm
November 14, 2018 — TAGSAM arm fully extended for the first time
April 15, 2020 — rehearsal manouvre performed by OSIRIS-REx
October 20, 2020 – successful TAGSAM deployment and sample collection

See also
CAESAR
Robotic arm
Sample-return mission

References

External links

TAGSAM Schematic
TAGSAM Testing Complete: OSIRIS-REx Prepared to TAG an Asteroid
Animation of TAGSAM head cover being jettisoned

OSIRIS-REx
Spacecraft instruments